The following is a list of the longhorn beetles recorded in Great Britain. For other beetles, see List of beetle species recorded in Britain.

Acanthocinus aedilis (Linnaeus, 1758)
Agapanthia villosoviridescens (De Geer, 1775)
Alosterna tabacicolor (De Geer, 1775)
Anaglyptus mysticus (Linnaeus, 1758)
Anastrangalia sanguinolenta (Linnaeus, 1761)
Anoplodera sexguttata (Fabricius, 1775)
Arhopalus ferus (Mulsant, 1839)
Arhopalus rusticus (Linnaeus, 1758)
Aromia moschata (Linnaeus, 1758)
Asemum striatum (Linnaeus, 1758)
Callidium violaceum (Linnaeus, 1758)
Cerambyx cerdo Linnaeus, 1758
Cerambyx scopolii Fuessly, 1775
Clytus arietis (Linnaeus, 1758)
Dinoptera collaris (Linnaeus, 1758)
Gracilia minuta (Fabricius, 1781)
Grammoptera abdominalis (Stephens, 1831)
Grammoptera ruficornis (Fabricius, 1781)
Grammoptera ustulata (Schaller, 1783)
Hylotrupes bajulus (Linnaeus, 1758)
Judolia sexmaculata (Linnaeus, 1758)
Lamia textor (Linnaeus, 1758)
Leiopus nebulosus (Linnaeus, 1758)
Leptura aurulenta Fabricius, 1793
Leptura quadrifasciata Linnaeus, 1758
Lepturobosca virens (Linnaeus, 1758)
Mesosa nebulosa (Fabricius, 1781)
Molorchus umbellatarum (Schreber, 1759)
Molorchus minor (Linnaeus, 1758)
Nathrius brevipennis (Mulsant, 1839)
Oberea oculata (Linnaeus, 1758)
Obrium brunneum (Fabricius, 1793)
Obrium cantharinum (Linnaeus, 1767)
Pachytodes cerambyciformis (Schrank, 1781)
Paracorymbia fulva (De Geer, 1775)
Pedostrangalia revestita (Linnaeus, 1767)
Phymatodes testaceus (Linnaeus, 1758)
Phytoecia cylindrica (Linnaeus, 1758)
Plagionotus arcuatus (Linnaeus, 1758)
Poecilium alni (Linnaeus, 1767)
Pogonocherus fasciculatus (De Geer, 1775)
Pogonocherus hispidulus (Piller & Mitterpacher, 1783)
Pogonocherus hispidus (Linnaeus, 1758)
Prionus coriarius (Linnaeus, 1758)
Pseudovadonia livida (Fabricius, 1777)
Pyrrhidium sanguineum (Linnaeus, 1758)
Rhagium bifasciatum Fabricius, 1775
Rhagium inquisitor (Linnaeus, 1758)
Rhagium mordax (De Geer, 1775)
Rutpela maculata (Poda, 1761)
Saperda carcharias (Linnaeus, 1758)
Saperda populnea (Linnaeus, 1758)
Saperda scalaris (Linnaeus, 1758)
Stenocorus meridianus (Linnaeus, 1758)
Stenostola dubia (Laicharting, 1784)
Stenurella melanura (Linnaeus, 1758)
Stenurella nigra (Linnaeus, 1758)
Stictoleptura rubra (Linnaeus, 1758)
Stictoleptura scutellata (Fabricius, 1781)
Strangalia attenuata (Linnaeus, 1758)
Tetropium castaneum (Linnaeus, 1758)
Tetropium gabrieli Weise, 1905
Tetrops praeustus (Linnaeus, 1758)
Tetrops starkii Chevrolat, 1859
Trinophylum cribratum Bates, 1878
Xylotoles griseus (Fabricius, 1775)

References

Longhorn beetles
 British Isles